Luis Domingo Jiménez Rodriguez (born January 18, 1988) is a Dominican Republic professional baseball third baseman for the Piratas de Campeche of the Mexican League. He has played in Major League Baseball (MLB) for the Los Angeles Angels of Anaheim, Milwaukee Brewers, and Boston Red Sox. He also played for the LG Twins of the Korea Baseball Organization (KBO).

Career

Los Angeles Angels of Anaheim 
Jiménez was signed as an international free agent by the Los Angeles Angels of Anaheim on August 22, 2005. He made his professional debut with the Dominican Summer League Angels in 2006, hitting .284/.341/.473 in 25 games. He returned to the team in 2007, batting .313/.347/.531 with 11 home runs and 55 RBI. In 2008, Jiménez played for the rookie-level Orem Owlz, posting a .331/.361/.630 slash line with 15 home runs and 65 RBI. Jiménez missed the 2009 season due to injury and joined the Single-A Cedar Rapids Kernels to begin the 2010 season, later receiving a promotion to the High-A Rancho Cucamonga Quakes, and hit a cumulative .288/.326/.506 with 14 home runs and 81 RBI. Jiménez participated in the 2010 All-Star Futures Game. Jiménez spent the 2012 season with the Double-A Arkansas Travelers, logging a .290/.335/.486 slash line with career-highs in home runs (18) and RBI (94). He was added to the Angels' 40-man roster after the 2011 season. Jiménez spent the 2012 season in Triple-A with the Salt Lake Bees, where he posted a .284/.326/.411 batting line in 48 games.

Jiménez was assigned to Triple-A Salt Lake to begin the 2013 season but was promoted to the major leagues for the first time on April 12, 2013. He made his MLB debut that day with the Angels and went 0-for-3 against the Houston Astros. He finished his rookie season with a .260/.291/.317 batting line in 34 games. For the 2014 season, Jiménez spent much of the year in Salt Lake, and made 18 appearances for the Angels, going 6-for-37 with no home runs.

Milwaukee Brewers
Jiménez was claimed off waivers by the Milwaukee Brewers on October 27, 2014. Jiménez was designated for assignment by Milwaukee on May 2, 2015, after going 1-for-15 in 15 games with the team.

Boston Red Sox
Jiménez was claimed off waivers by the Boston Red Sox on May 3, 2015. Jiménez made only 1 appearance for the Red Sox, going hitless in his only at-bat, before he was designated for assignment on May 11. He accepted an outright assignment to Triple-A Pawtucket Red Sox on May 14. Jiménez hit .140 in 14 games with Pawtucket before being released on June 15.

LG Twins
On June 16, 2015, Jiménez signed with the LG Twins of the Korea Baseball Organization (KBO). In 70 games with the Twins, Jiménez slashed .312/.344/.505 with 11 home runs and 46 RBI. For the 2016 season, Jiménez played in 135 games with the Twins, logging a .308/.363/.526 slash line with 26 home runs and 102 RBI. In 2017, Jiménez hit .276/.333/.436 with 7 home runs and 30 RBI in 51 games before suffering an ankle injury while rounding first base. On July 21, 2017, Jiménez was released by the Twins to make room on the roster for the newly-signed James Loney.

Diablos Rojos del México
On July 18, 2018, Jiménez signed with the Diablos Rojos del México of the Mexican Baseball League. In 43 games for México, Jiménez slashed .291/.351/.488 with 8 home runs and 33 RBI.

Tohoku Rakuten Golden Eagles
On February 22, 2019, Jiménez signed to a developmental contract with the Tohoku Rakuten Golden Eagles of Nippon Professional Baseball (NPB). He would appear in 67 games with Rakuten's minor league club, batting .234/.299/.385 with 5 home runs and 25 RBI, never appearing in a game for the main club. On December 2, he became a free agent.

Arizona Diamondbacks
On December 18, 2019, Jiménez signed a minor league deal with the Arizona Diamondbacks. He did not play in a game in 2020 due to the cancellation of the minor league season because of the COVID-19 pandemic. Jiménez was released by the Diamondbacks organization on May 22, 2020.

Piratas de Campeche
On June 29, 2021, Jiménez signed with the Piratas de Campeche of the Mexican League.

References

External links

1988 births
Living people
Arizona League Angels players
Arkansas Travelers players
Boston Red Sox players
Cedar Rapids Kernels players
Dominican Republic expatriate baseball players in Japan
Dominican Republic expatriate baseball players in South Korea
Dominican Republic expatriate baseball players in the United States
Dominican Summer League Angels players
Estrellas Orientales players
KBO League infielders

LG Twins players
Los Angeles Angels players
Major League Baseball players from the Dominican Republic
Major League Baseball third basemen
Milwaukee Brewers players
Naranjeros de Hermosillo players
Orem Owlz players
Pawtucket Red Sox players
People from Santiago de los Caballeros
Rancho Cucamonga Quakes players
Salt Lake Bees players
Águilas Cibaeñas players
Diablos Rojos del México players
Dominican Republic expatriate baseball players in Mexico
Gigantes del Cibao players
Piratas de Campeche players